Burris Nunatak is a nunatak near the northern extremity of the Emlen Peaks,  northwest of Mount Cox, in the Usarp Mountains, a major mountain range situated in Victoria Land, Antarctica. The geographical feature was first mapped by the United States Geological Survey from surveys and from U.S. Navy air photos, 1960–63, and named by the Advisory Committee on Antarctic Names for James M. Burris, assistant to the United States Antarctic Research Program representative at McMurdo Station, Hut Point Peninsula, Ross Island, 1967–68. The nunatak lies situated on the Pennell Coast, a portion of Antarctica lting between Cape Williams and Cape Adare.

References 

Nunataks of Victoria Land
Pennell Coast